Viya (Gheviya, Eviya, Avias) is a minor Bantu language of Gabon. A collection of proverbs in their language has been published, with French translations. Also, a bilingual dictionary has been compiled.

References

Tsogo languages